Vagharshak Varnazi Harutiunyan (born 28 April 1956) is an Armenian military figure and politician currently serving as Armenia's ambassador to Russia. He previously served as the Defence Minister of Armenia from 1999 to 2000 and again from 2020 to 2021.

Early life
Harutiunyan was born in Akhalkalaki, Georgian SSR (now Georgia), a region with a large Armenian population.

Military career

Soviet Army and CIS service 
He graduated from the Caspian Higher Naval School in 1978. From 1978 to 1989, he fought in the Soviet–Afghan War. Harutiunyan than graduated from the Grechko Naval Academy and the Military Academy of the General Staff of the Armed Forces of the Soviet Union in 1991.

He switched allegiance to Armenia prior to the fall of the Soviet Union. Harutiunyan was named Deputy Minister of Internal Affairs and Deputy Chairman of the Defence Committee of Armenia in 1991, in the middle of the First Nagorno-Karabakh War. In 1992, he became the Deputy Chief of Staff of the High Command of the Armed Forces of the Commonwealth of Independent States. Harutiunyan was chosen as the representative of the Armenian Armed Forces at the CIS in 1994.

First term as defence minister (1999–2000) 
In 1999, Harutiunyan returned to Armenia to replace Vazgen Sargsyan as Defence Minister of Armenia on 11 June 1999 after Sargsyan was elected Prime Minister. Harutiunyan joined Sargsyan and Head of the Government Staff Shahen Karamanukyan in the meeting of the Commonwealth of Independent States (CIS) heads of government in Yalta, Ukraine on 7 October 1999. In February 2000, he discussed a plan for cooperation between Armenia and Belarus with his Belarusian counterpart, Aleksandr Petrovich Chumakov during his visit to Minsk to discuss Armenian use of Belarusian military plants for upgrading Armenian military equipment. He left the post of defence minister on 20 May 2000. On 22 July 2002, Harutiunyan was stripped of his military rank of lieutenant general by order of President of Armenia Robert Kocharyan.

Career (2000-2020) 
On 23 July 2002, Harutiunyan joined the opposition Hanrapetutyun Party, led by Aram Sargsyan, the brother of Vazgen Sargsyan. In 2005, together with Albert Bazeyan, he founded the National Revival Party. In 2007 the party ceased its activities and merged with the Ramkavar Azatakan Party, although Harutyunyan opposed this. In 2016, there were rumors about his possible appointment to the post of Secretary General of the Collective Security Treaty Organization. In 2019, his military rank of lieutenant general was restored. In August 2020, he was appointed Chief Military Advisor to the Prime Minister of Armenia.

Second term as defence minister (2020-2021) 
Harutiunyan was appointed as defence minister by Prime Minister Nikol Pashinyan and President Armen Sarksyan on 20 November 2020, following the resignation of David Tonoyan. His appointment were among a number of changes in the Second Pashinyan government following the Nagorno-Karabakh ceasefire agreement that ended the Second Nagorno-Karabakh War. In his appointment ceremony, he thanked the Prime Minister for his confidence, stating he hopes his leadership will "preserve the positive we had in the Army" and "assess the objective and subjective reasons within a short period of time and submit a new package of reforms". The day after his appointment, he met with his Russian counterpart Sergei Shoigu, where they discussed the Russian peacekeeping force in Nagorno-Karabakh.

Awards 

 Medal “For Services to the Motherland”
 He received medals, orders and other high state awards of Armenia, the NKR, Russia, the USSR, Belarus, Bulgaria, Tajikistan and a number of other countries.
 Nominal weapon (gifts from former Minister of Defence Vazgen Sargsyan and former Russian Minister of Defence Pavel Grachev.

See also 
 Embassy of Armenia to Russia

References

External links
 Interview dated October 2009 

1956 births
Living people
Armenian generals
Government ministers of Armenia
Defence ministers of Armenia
Military Academy of the General Staff of the Armed Forces of the Soviet Union alumni
Georgian people of Armenian descent